Andrej Tavželj (born March 14, 1984) is a Slovenian professional  ice hockey player. He is currently under contract to Slovenian team HDD Jesenice of the Alps Hockey League. He participated at the 2011 IIHF World Championship as a member of the Slovenia men's national ice hockey team.

Career statistics

Regular season and playoffs

International

References

External links

 Profile at Siol

1984 births
Living people
People from the Municipality of Tržič
HDD Olimpija Ljubljana players
HK Poprad players
Ice hockey players at the 2014 Winter Olympics
Olympic ice hockey players of Slovenia
Slovenian ice hockey defencemen
Slovenian expatriate sportspeople in Italy
Slovenian expatriate sportspeople in Slovakia
Slovenian expatriate sportspeople in France
Slovenian expatriate sportspeople in Russia
Slovenian expatriate sportspeople in Austria
Slovenian expatriate ice hockey people
Expatriate ice hockey players in Austria
Expatriate ice hockey players in Italy
Expatriate ice hockey players in France
Expatriate ice hockey players in Russia
Expatriate ice hockey players in Slovakia
HK Acroni Jesenice players
HDD Jesenice players
HK Slavija Ljubljana players
EC KAC players
Ducs d'Angers players
Toros Neftekamsk players
Dragons de Rouen players
SG Pontebba players
SG Cortina players